Starmark Co., Ltd, trading as Starmark is a privately held, Thailand built-in furniture company that specialize in kitchen and bathroom products. The company was founded in 1977.  It took the current name in 1995.

As of 2000, it was the second-largest furniture manufacturer in Thailand.

Organization
Starmark Co., Ltd.—designs and develops built-in kitchen.
Starmark Manufacturing Co., Ltd.—manufactures kitchen product using particle boards and quarandum tops.
Mogen (Thailand) Co., Ltd.—manufactures and sells the bathroom product brand Mogen.
Living At Home Co., Ltd.
Delight Cooking Center Co., Ltd.—cooking school approved by Thailand Ministry of Education.

Showroom 

MBK Center 5th floor
CentralWorld 5th floor
Central Plaza Pinklao 4th floor
Central City Bangna 4th floor
Future Park Rangsit 2nd floor
Homepro all branches, under the name Estetik
Homework all branches

References

External links 
 Official site

Furniture companies of Thailand
Manufacturing companies based in Bangkok
Companies established in 1982
1982 establishments in Thailand
Thai brands